Vanishing Point is an experimental novel by David Markson which was published in 2004.

References

2004 American novels